John Guthrie Wood Aitken (6 February 1849 – 17 August 1921) was the Mayor of Wellington, New Zealand from 1900 to 1905.

Biography

Early life
Aitken was born at Low Park Farm, Kilchenzie, Kintyre, Argyleshire, Scotland, on 6 February 1849 and educated at Campbeltown Grammar School.

Aitken was employed by James Templeton and Co, Glasgow. He was apparently a skilled employee, being sent to London to take charge of the Company, a position he held for 12 years. In 1882 he became acquainted with George Wilson and entered into partnership with him as a general merchant in Wellington, New Zealand. Aitken became a Director of Guardian Insurance Company, the Australian Widows' Fund (which amalgamated with the Mutual Life Association of Australasia), Scoullar and Co, Fresh Food and Ice Co, Consolidated Dental Co, as well as some other companies. He was also Chairman of Directors of the New Zealand Board of the New Zealand Loan and Mercantile Agency Company.

Political career

In 1899 Aitken entered politics being elected Mayor of Wellington from 1900 to May 1905 when he retired. He represented the City of Wellington electorate from 1902 (he was successful in his first attempt to enter parliament) to 1905, and then the Wellington East electorate from 1905 to 1908. He did not stand in 1908, thus ending his term. He was a member of the Legislative Council from 1914 to 1921.

He was Chairman of the Wellington Education Board, and in 1917 was the first layman to be Moderator of the General Assembly of the Presbyterian Church of New Zealand. Aitken was one of the founders of the Boys Institute and assisted developing the YMCA in Wellington. Together with the Rev. Dr James Gibb, Aitken was a co-founder of Scots College and Queen Margaret College. He was a supporter of Bible in Schools and the Prohibition movements.

Both Aitken Street and Guthrie Street in Wellington are named after him.

Death
Aitken died at his home at 2 Levy Street, Wellington on 17 August 1921, and he was buried at Karori Cemetery.

Notes

References

 Allan, Jonathan Aitken. "A Hearty Vote of Thanks – The Hon. John G. W Aitken, MLC of Wellington" 2013.

External links
Sketch of John Aitken

|-

|-

1849 births
1921 deaths
Mayors of Wellington
New Zealand MPs for Wellington electorates
Members of the New Zealand Legislative Council
New Zealand Presbyterians
Members of the New Zealand House of Representatives
Scottish emigrants to New Zealand
People from Kintyre
Burials at Karori Cemetery
Wellington Hospital Board members